Celebrating Sinatra is a 1996 studio album by American jazz saxophonist Joe Lovano released by the Blue Note label. Lovano leads a fifteen-piece ensemble to play famous Sinatra's songs.

Track listing

Personnel
Joe Lovano – producer, tenor saxophone
George Mraz – bass (tracks: 1, 3 to 13)
Michael Rabinowitz – bassoon (tracks: 1 6 8 12)
Erik Friedlander – cello (tracks: 1 3 5 6 8 9 11 12)
Manny Albam – conductor (tracks: 1 6 8 12)
Al Foster – drums
John Clark  – French horn (tracks: 1 6 8 12)
Emily Mitchell – harp (tracks: 1 6 8 12)
Kenny Werner – piano (tracks: 1, 3 to 6, 8 to 13)
Billy Drewes – soprano saxophone, clarinet (bass) (tracks: 1 3 5 6 8 9 12)
Ted Nash – tenor saxophone, clarinet (tracks: 1 3 5 6 8 9 11 12)
Dick Oatts – tenor saxophone, flute (tracks: 1 3 5 6 8 9 11)
Tom Christensen – tenor saxophone, oboe, English horn (tracks: 1 3 5 6 8 9 11 12)
Lois Martin – viola (tracks: 1 6 8 12)
Mark Feldman – violin (tracks: 1 6 8 12)
Sara Parkins – violin (tracks: 1 6 8 12)
Judi Silvano – vocals (soprano) (tracks: 1 3 5 6 8 9 11 12)
James Farber – engineer

References

External links
 

Blue Note Records albums
Joe Lovano albums
1996 albums
Frank Sinatra tribute albums